Cerveceria de Baja California (founded in 2002), is located in the City of Mexicali, is one of a handful of Mexican microbrews was acquired by Grupo Modelo in 20151. The product they brew is Cucapá Beer. This name comes from the Cocopah (Cucapá in Spanish), one of the five indigenous tribes that live in the Mexicali Valley. The Cucapá tribe was the first settlers of the region and their love for water and nature took them to live in the Colorado River delta.

The tradition of nature, the water of the river, the geographical location and the initiative of being the first people to explore the region is what makes Cerveza Cucapá as unique as the Cucapá tribe's ancestors.

The Beers

Cucapá Clasica
4.5% ABV
Blond Ale. This golden colored beer with a fruity and flowery aroma is medium bodied with a taste of malt and sweet citrus. It is paired well with light meats and fish.

Cucapá Obscura
4.5% ABV
American Brown Ale. Deep chestnut brown color with a medium brown head. Sweet toffee, roasted nuts, and brown sugar aromas follow through to a smooth, dry, body with roundness, purity and depth. Finishes with a rich dark roasted nut, baker's chocolate, and an earthy hop fade.

Cucapá Chupacabras Pale Ale
5.8% ABV
American Pale Ale. Wildly hopped with fresh cascade and centennial hops. Deep copper color with a lacy taupe head. Rich creamy dark caramel, dark chocolate, and roasted nut aromas follow through to a rich medium-full body with layers of citrus marmalade and earthy hops on the long finish.

Cucapá Trigueña
3.5% ABV
Wheat Ale. This wheat ale is clear and refreshing. A golden color and light body with a taste of malt and wheat.

Cucapá Honey
4.5% ABV
Amber Ale. Deep golden amber color with a frothy white head. Rich aromas of caramel, roasted grains, and earthy, citrusy hop aromas. A frothy entry leads to a dry-yet-fruity medium body of candied citrus peels, mild spice, flan, and toasted grains. Finishes with a long, nutty, citrus-accented, piney fresh hop fade.

Cucapá Light
3.5% ABV
Light Lager. Flavorful light lager with reduced alcohol and calories.

Cucapá Barleywine
10.0% ABV
Barleywine. Dark reddish mahogany color. Roasted malt and dark caramel aromas. A rich, thick entry leads to a very sweet molasses and chocolate covered citrus flavors. Finishes with a mild, bitter hop fade.

Seasonals

Cucapá Jefe
4.5% ABV
This Hefeweizen style beer without filtration process, made with wheat and barley malt. The Cucapá Jefe has a bright peach color.

Cucapá Mestiza
4.5% ABV
It has a characteristic amber color. Also has a complete body and a distinguish hop flavor.

See also
Cerveceria de Baja California

External links
Cucapá - Official website.
Wine Warehouse - California Distributor
Little Guy Distributing - Arizona Distributor
Union Tribune - "Mexican Beer Gets Serious" (November 30, 2005)

Mexicali
Economy of Baja California
Beer in Mexico
Mexican brands